is a Japanese kabaddi manga series by Hajime Musashino. It has been serialized in Shogakukan's Ura Sunday website and MangaONE app since July 2015 and has been collected in twenty-two tankōbon volumes. An anime television series adaptation by TMS Entertainment aired from April 3 to June 19, 2021.

Characters

Nōkin High School

Souwa High School

Saitama Kōyō High School

Media

Manga
Burning Kabaddi is a manga series written and illustrated by Hajime Musashino. The series began serialization in Shogakukan's Ura Sunday website and MangaONE app in July 2015. Shogakukan has collected its chapters into individual tankōbon volumes. As of August 10, 2022, twenty-two volumes have been published.

Anime
An anime television series adaptation was announced on July 6, 2020. Produced by TMS Entertainment, the series is directed by Kazuya Ichikawa and written by Yūko Kakihara. Mari Takada is designing the characters, and Ken Ito is composing the series' music. DOMERICA is credited with animation cooperation. The opening theme, "Fire Bird", is performed by Shunya Ōhira, while the ending theme, "Comin' Back" is performed by Yūma Uchida. The series aired from April 3 to June 19, 2021 on TV Tokyo, TV Osaka, TV Aichi, and AT-X. Crunchyroll licensed the series outside of Asia. Medialink has licensed the series in Southeast Asia, and is streaming it on their partnered platforms. 

It has been seen that fans of anime in India and its neighbouring countries desired the anime to be released in their respective regions because of it being the only anime based on a sport originating from the Indian subcontinent. However, there has not been any provisions made for people in the Indian subcontinent to stream the anime legally.

Reception
Burning Kabaddi was nominated for the 66th Shogakukan Manga Award in the shōnen category in 2020.

Anime News Network had six editors review the first episode of the anime: Caitlin Moore critiqued that it contained "moderately typical sports anime beats" but felt its cast displayed "little in terms of depth or complexity" and the animation degraded as it went into the kabaddi scenes; Nicholas Dupree commended the episode for explaining the central sport's fundamentals but criticized the stiff animation and shoddy direction of the kabaddi matches, and the unlikable cast ranging from "mildly unpleasant to loudly unpleasant"; Richard Eisenbeis also praised the explanation of the sport but was unimpressed with the overall cast and humor, saying: "Frankly, despite the rather fluid animation and interesting subject matter, this is not a series I would likely choose to pick up."; James Beckett criticized the production for having weak direction in its character interactions and not displaying "fast, fluid, and impactful animation" in its kabaddi scenes; Rebecca Silverman wrote: "In all honesty, Burning Kabaddi looks like it's going to be like any other sports anime [...] It'll probably be fine, and the lure of a somewhat unusual sport may be enough of a draw for those on the fence." The sixth reviewer, Lynzee Loveridge, wrote: "I want to recommend Burning Kabaddi for its efforts to highlight a unique sport and for its particularly dumb teen protagonist, but I found nothing impressive about this premiere and much of its sports action falls flat."

Notes

References

External links
Burning Kabaddi at Ura Sunday 
  
 

2021 anime television series debuts
Anime series based on manga
Crunchyroll anime
Japanese webcomics
Kabaddi
Medialink
School life in anime and manga
Shogakukan manga
Shōnen manga
Sports anime and manga
TMS Entertainment
TV Tokyo original programming
Webcomics in print